Hepburn may refer to:

Surname
People with the surname Hepburn (the most famous in recent times being actresses Katharine Hepburn and Audrey Hepburn):
 Hepburn (surname)

Linguistics
 Hepburn romanization, a system for the romanization of Japanese

Places

Australia 
 Shire of Hepburn, a local government area in Victoria
 Hepburn Springs, Victoria, a resort town in Victoria

Canada 
 Hepburn, Saskatchewan, a small farming and college community

United Kingdom 
 Hepburn, Northumberland

United States 
 Hepburn, Indiana, an unincorporated community
 Hepburn, Iowa, a city in Page County
 Hepburn, Ohio, an unincorporated community in Hardin County
 Hepburn Township, Pennsylvania, in Lycoming County

Other uses
 Hepburn (band), a British pop rock band

See also
 Hepburn Act of 1906, giving the US Interstate Commerce Commission the power to set railroad rates
 Hepburn Avenue, a road in Perth, Western Australia
 Hepburn Block, an office building in Toronto, Ontario